Prince George-Valemount is a provincial electoral district in British Columbia, Canada, established by the Electoral Districts Act, 2008 out of most of Prince George-Mount Robson and small parts of Prince George North, Prince George-Omineca and Cariboo North. It was first contested in the 2009 provincial election.

Geography

As of the 2020 provincial election, Prince George-Valemount comprises the southern portion of the Regional District of Fraser-Fort George, located in east-central British Columbia. The electoral district contains the communities of Valemount, McBride and the southeastern portion of Prince George. The boundary line within the city of Prince George comes from the east following along the Fraser, and then the Nechako River to the John Hart Bridge where it goes south along Highway 97, west along Massey Drive, south along Ospika Boulevard until Ferry Avenue. The boundary then cuts west to just south of the University of Northern British Columbia before traveling south down Tyner Boulevard, then follows Highway 16 out of the city to the west.

History 
This riding has elected the following Members of Legislative Assembly:

Member of Legislative Assembly 
Its MLA is Shirley Bond of the British Columbia Liberal Party.  Bond was initially elected to the district of Prince George-Mount Robson.

Election results 

|-

 
|NDP
|Julie Carew
|align="right"|6,737
|align="right"|37.58
|align="right"|
|align="right"|$82,706

|- style="background:white;"
! style="text-align:right;" colspan="3"|Total Valid Votes
!align="right"|17,927
!align="right"|100%
|- style="background:white;"
! style="text-align:right;" colspan="3"|Total Rejected Ballots
!align="right"|114
!align="right"|0.6%
|- style="background:white;"
! style="text-align:right;" colspan="3"|Turnout
!align="right"|18,041
!align="right"|52%
|}

References

British Columbia provincial electoral districts
Politics of Prince George, British Columbia